Sylvia Morris may refer to:

 Sylvia Jukes Morris, British biographer
 Dame Sylvia Morris, British headteacher (see List of Dames Commander of the Order of the British Empire)